The House of Albret, which derived its name from the lordship (seigneurie) of Albret (Labrit), situated in the Landes, was one of the most powerful feudal families of France in the Middle Ages.

History
Its members distinguished themselves in the local wars of that epoch; and during the 14th century they espoused the English cause for some time, afterwards transferring their support to the side of France.

Arnaud Amanieu, lord of Albret, helped to take Guienne from the English. His son Charles became constable of France, and was killed at the Battle of Agincourt in 1415. Alain the Great, lord of Albret (died 1522), wished to marry Anne of Brittany, and to that end fought against Charles VIII; but his hopes being ended by the betrothal of Anne to Maximilian of Austria, he surrendered Nantes to the French in 1486.

At that time the house of Albret had attained considerable territorial importance, due in great part to the liberal grants which it had obtained from successive kings of France. John of Albret, son of Alain, became king of Navarre by his marriage with Catherine of Foix. Their son Henry II, king of Navarre, was created duke of Albret and peer of France in 1550. By his wife Marguerite d'Angoulême, sister of Francis I, Henry II had a daughter, Jeanne d'Albret, queen of Navarre, who married Anthony de Bourbon, duke of Vendôme, and became the mother of Henry IV, king of France.

The Dukedom of Albret, united to the crown of France by the accession of this prince, was granted to the family of La Tour d'Auvergne (see duc de Bouillon) in 1651, in exchange for Sedan and Raucourt.

To a younger branch of this house belonged Jean d'Albret, seigneur of Orval, count of Dreux and of Rethel, governor of Champagne (died 1524), who was employed by Francis I in many diplomatic negotiations, more particularly in his intrigues to get himself elected emperor in 1519.

Lords of Albret

 Amanieu I (fl. 1050)
 Amanieu II (fl. 1096)
 Amanieu III (fl. 1130)
 Bernard I (fl. 1140)
 Amanieu IV (fl. 1174, died c. 1209)
 Amanieu V (died 1255)
 Amanieu VI (died c. 1270)
 Bernard Ezi I, 1270–1281
 Mathe d'Albret, 1281–1295
 Isabelle d'Albret, 1295–1298
 Amanieu VII, 1298–1324
 Bernard Ezi II, 1324–1358
 Arnaud Amanieu, 1358–1401
 Charles I d'Albret, 1401–1415
 Charles II d'Albret, 1415–1471
 Jean I of Albret (associated, died before 1471) also known as Jean I, viscount of Tartas
 Alain I of Albret le Grand, 1471–1522
 Jean II of Albret (associated, died 1516)
 Henry I of Albret 1522–1555  King of Navarre as Henry II
 Jeanne d'Albret 1555–1572 Queen of Navarre as Jeanne III of Navarre.
 Henry IV of France 1572–1610 (son of Jeanne III)

Armorial

See also 
 Navarre monarchs family tree
 Guiraude de Dax

Citations

References
 
 
 
 
 
 

Attribution:

 
Albret